Laodamia faecella is a species of snout moth. It is found from most of  Europe (except Ireland, Great Britain, the Benelux, the Iberian Peninsula and most of the Balkan Peninsula) to Japan.

Its wingspan is 24–28 mm.

References

Moths described in 1839
Phycitini
Moths of Japan
Moths of Europe
Taxa named by Philipp Christoph Zeller